James Hubert Kingston (born 30 November 1965) is a South African professional golfer.

Career
Kingston was born in Ottosdal, South Africa. He turned professional in 1988, and is currently a member of the European Tour and the Sunshine Tour. He has also competed on the Asian Tour, where he collected four tournament victories.

In 2007, Kingston finished top of the Order of Merit on the Sunshine Tour, aided by his victory at the European Tour co-sanctioned South African Airways Open. That win was his first on the European Tour, and helped him to his best Order of Merit finish of 17th in 2008.

Victory at the Sunshine Tour's Vodacom Championship in February 2008, lifted Kingston into the top 100 of the Official World Golf Rankings for the first time.

Kingston secured his first win of 2009 with a playoff triumph against Anders Hansen at the 2009 Mercedes-Benz Championship in Cologne.

Professional wins (19)

European Tour wins (2)

1Co-sanctioned by the Sunshine Tour

European Tour playoff record (1–1)

Asian Tour wins (4)

1Co-sanctioned by the Korean Tour

Asian Tour playoff record (2–0)

Sunshine Tour wins (11)

1Co-sanctioned by the European Tour

Sunshine Tour playoff record (2–0)

European Senior Tour wins (2)

Other senior wins (1)

Results in major championships

Note: Kingston never played in the Masters Tournament or the U.S. Open.

CUT = missed the half-way cut
"T" = tied

Results in World Golf Championships

"T" = Tied
Note that the HSBC Champions did not become a WGC event until 2009.

References

External links

South African male golfers
European Tour golfers
Sunshine Tour golfers
European Senior Tour golfers
People from Tswaing Local Municipality
People from Rustenburg
1965 births
Living people
White South African people